Haramaki is a type of chest armour (dou or dō) worn by the samurai class of feudal Japan and their retainers.

Description
Haramaki were originally constructed with the same materials as the ō-yoroi but designed for foot soldiers to use as opposed to the ō-yoroi which was for mounted warfare. Haramaki refers to any Japanese armour which is put on from the front and then fastened in the back with cords. Other types of dō open from the side (ni-mai dō, dō-maru, maru-dō) instead of opening from the back as the haramaki does.

Modern haramaki'' are thick cloth undergarments worn around the belly to increase body heat retention during the winter.

See also
Japanese armour

References

External links 

 Traditional Haramaki photographs
 Anthony Bryant's web site about construction and history of Japanese armor

Samurai armour